Sover (Soér in local dialect) is a comune (municipality) in Trentino in the northern Italian region Trentino-Alto Adige/Südtirol, located about  northeast of Trento.

Geography

The municipality of Sover contains the frazioni (subdivisions, mainly villages and hamlets) Montesover, Piscine, Facendi, Piazzoli, Sveseri and Settefontane.

Sover borders the following municipalities: Capriana, Valfloriana, Grauno, Grumes, Segonzano, Lona-Lases and Bedollo.

Demographic evolution

References

Cities and towns in Trentino-Alto Adige/Südtirol